Frederika Marie Joseph (Frieda) Brepoels (born on 7 May 1955 in Mopertingen, Belgium) is a Belgian politician of N-VA, mayor of Bilzen and former Member of the European Parliament for Flanders.

Career
Brepoels is architect by profession, having studied architecture in Hasselt. She worked from 1978 to 1993 as an independent architect.

Brepoels started her political career in the People's Union (Volksunie, VU). Aged 27, she became municipal councillor in Bilzen in 1982. From 1985 until 1987, she was provincial councillor of Limburg.

From 1987 until 2003, she was member of the Chamber of Representatives, except for the period 1991–1999 when she was deputy in the provincial executive of Limburg.

She became Member of the European Parliament in 2004 as a substitute for Geert Bourgeois, who did not take up his seat. In the European Parliament, she sat on the Committee on the Environment, Public Health and Food Safety and she was a substitute for the Committee on Civil Liberties, Justice and Home Affairs, a member of the Delegation to the EU-Armenia, EU-Azerbaijan and EU-Georgia Parliamentary Cooperation Committees and a substitute for the Delegation for relations with the countries of the Andean Community.

Since 1 January 2013, following the October 2012 local elections, she is mayor of Bilzen. Mark Demesmaeker succeeded her in the European Parliament.

She was candidate for the Chamber of Representatives in the 2014 elections, but was not elected.

Career
 1978–1993: Self-employed architect
 1988–2001: Member of the VU party council and executive
 since 2001: Vice-Chairwoman of the N-VA
 since 2001: Member of the administrative committee
 since 2001: Member of the party executive
 since 2001: Member of the party council
 since 2001: Member of the Limburg provincial executive and council
 1982–1991: Member of the Bilzen Municipal Council
 1982–1988: Deputy Mayor of Bilzen
 1987–1991: Flemish Council (double mandate with the federal parliament)
 1985–1987: Member of the Limburg Provincial Council
 1991–1999: Member for Limburg
 1987–1991 and 1999–2003: Member of the federal parliament
 2000–2003: group chairwoman, House of Representatives

See also
 2004 European Parliament election in Belgium

External links 

 Personal Website 
 
 

1955 births
Living people
New Flemish Alliance MEPs
MEPs for Belgium 2004–2009
MEPs for Belgium 2009–2014
21st-century women MEPs for Belgium
People's Union (Belgium) politicians

References